Salagena obsolescens is a moth in the family Cossidae. It is found in South Africa.

The larvae possibly feed on Sonneratia alba.

References

Natural History Museum Lepidoptera generic names catalog

Endemic moths of South Africa
Metarbelinae
Moths described in 1910